The Chao Phraya Dam is a barrage dam in Sapphaya district, Chai Nat province, Thailand. The dam has sixteen 12.5-metre gates. It was built between 1952 and 1957.

References

Dams in Thailand
Barrages (dam)
Dams completed in 1957
1957 establishments in Thailand
Buildings and structures in Chai Nat province
Buildings and structures on the Chao Phraya River